Xanthocnemis is a genus of narrow-winged damselflies in the family Coenagrionidae. There are at least two described species in Xanthocnemis, found in New Zealand.

Species
These two species belong to the genus Xanthocnemis:
 Xanthocnemis tuanuii Rowe, 1981 (Chatham Redcoat Damselfly)
 Xanthocnemis zealandica (McLachlan, 1873) (Common Redcoat Damselfy)

References

Further reading

 
 

Coenagrionidae